Nasal hair or nose hair, is the hair in the human nose. Adult humans have hair in the nostrils. Nasal hair functions include filtering foreign particles from entering the nasal cavity, and collecting moisture. In support of the first function, the results of a 2011 study indicated that increased nasal hair density decreases the development of asthma in those who have seasonal rhinitis, possibly due to an increased capacity of the hair in the nostrils to filter out pollen and other allergens.

Nasal hair is different from the cilia of the ciliated lining of the nasal cavity. These cilia are microtubular-based structures that are found in the respiratory tract, involved in the mucociliary clearance mechanism.

Removal

A number of devices have been sold to trim nasal hair, including miniature rotary clippers and attachments for electric shavers. The trimmers shorten the hair to such lengths that they do not appear outside of the nasal passage. A pair of tweezers may also be used to facilitate the removal of such hairs. Other means are in effect such as waxing. Nasal hair removal can result in negative health consequences, such as ingrown hair or nasal vestibulitis.

References

Nose
Human hair